"Night Fever" is a song written and performed by the Bee Gees. It first appeared on the soundtrack to Saturday Night Fever on RSO Records. Producer Robert Stigwood wanted to call the film Saturday Night, but singer Robin Gibb expressed hesitation at the title. Stigwood liked the title Night Fever but was wary of marketing a movie with that name. The song bounded up the Billboard charts while the Bee Gees’ two previous hits from Saturday Night Fever soundtrack ("How Deep is Your Love" and "Stayin' Alive") were still in the top ten. The record debuted on the Billboard Hot 100 Chart at #76, then leaped up 44 positions to #32. It then moved: 32–17–8–5–2–1. It remained at #1 for eight weeks (the most for any single that year), and ultimately spent 13 weeks in the top 10. For the first five weeks that "Night Fever" was at #1, "Stayin' Alive" was at #2. Also, for one week in March, Bee Gees related songs held five of the top positions on the Hot 100 chart, and more impressively, four of the top five positions, with "Night Fever" at the top of the list. The B-side of "Night Fever" was a live version of "Down the Road" taken from the Bee Gees 1977 album,  Here at Last... Bee Gees... Live.

Inspiration and writing
When Bee Gees manager Robert Stigwood was producing a movie about a New York disco scene, the working title for the film at that time was Saturday Night. Stigwood asked the group to write a song using that name as a title, but the Bee Gees disliked it. They had already written a song called "Night Fever", so the group convinced Stigwood to use that and change the film to Saturday Night Fever.

The string intro of "Night Fever" was inspired by "Theme from A Summer Place" by Percy Faith, according to keyboardist Blue Weaver when he was performing it one morning at the sessions and Barry Gibb walked in and heard the new idea for this song. As Weaver explains the history behind this song:

{{quote|...'Night Fever' started off because Barry walked in one morning when I was trying to work out something. I always wanted to do a disco version of Theme from A Summer Place by the Percy Faith Orchestra or something - it was a big hit in the Sixties. I was playing that, and Barry said, 'What was that?' and I said, 'Theme from A Summer Place''', and Barry said, 'No, it wasn't'. It was new. Barry heard the idea - I was playing it on a string synthesizer and sang the riff over it.|Blue Weaver}}

Barry Gibb, Robin Gibb and Maurice Gibb completed the lyrics for "Night Fever" sitting on a staircase (reminiscent of their first international hit "New York Mining Disaster 1941", which was written also in a staircase back in 1967).

Recording
The Bee Gees began recording this song by April 1977 in France and finishing it in September the same year. A demo of "Night Fever" with some instrumental and vocals heard on it exists and was available to download on Rhino Records' website in 2009 or earlier.

Reception
According to Billboard, it has a "jumping disco beat" and a "smooth falsetto lead" vocal.  Cash Box similarly said that it has "dancin' beat, scratchy guitar, sweeping orchestration and the familiar falsetto." Record World predicted that it would become "another dance tempo hit" for the Bee Gees.

Legacy
It also replaced Andy Gibb's "Love Is Thicker Than Water" at number one and was in turn replaced by Yvonne Elliman's "If I Can't Have You"—all of which were written and produced by the Gibb brothers. It would be the third of six consecutive US #1s for the band, tying the Beatles for the record for most consecutive #1 singles. Billboard ranked it as the No. 2 song for 1978, behind Andy Gibb's "Shadow Dancing".

"Night Fever" topped the UK Singles Chart for two weeks, their third UK number-one, and in the US it remained the number-one Billboard Hot 100 single for over two months in 1978. In addition to Saturday Night Fever, the song has also appeared in the movie and on the soundtrack for Mystery Men. The song is listed at number 38 on Billboard's All Time Top 100. It is also featured in other films including Luna, Mr. Saturday Night, I.D., Whatever Happened to Harold Smith?, and Avenue Montaigne.

Music video
A music video was made for the song in 1978, but not shown to the public until 26 years later, in 2004. It features the brothers singing the song in a darkened studio, layered over background video filmed while driving along "Motel Row" on Collins Avenue, a  motel strip in what is now Sunny Isles Beach, Florida. Most of the motels which appear in the video are now closed or demolished, including several whose names are reminiscent of Las Vegas resorts (Castaways, Desert Inn, Sahara, Golden Nugget).

Personnel
Barry Gibb – lead, harmony and backing vocals, rhythm guitar
Robin Gibb – harmony and backing vocals
Maurice Gibb – bass, harmony and backing vocals
Alan Kendall – lead guitar
Dennis Bryon – drums
Blue Weaver – Fender Rhodes electric piano and String synthesizer

Charts

Weekly charts

Year-end charts

All-time charts

Certifications and sales

 Ex-It version 

In 1996, the Austrian music group Ex-It covered the song and made a small notable success. Large parts of the original were retained in this version, but with many rap passages added. This cover is the compilations Dance Now! 14, Maxi Dance Sensation 21 and Hot Hits [TL 541/35]''.

Music video
The music video copies many elements of the movie Saturday Night Fever and satirizes the same. At the beginning of the video, the DJ plays the song, while the protagonist and his girlfriend in a tool shop look around and watch a radio. Then prepare for a visit to a disco and dance there in the rest of the plot.

Charts

References

External links
 Night Fever information at SuperSeventies

1977 songs
1978 singles
1996 singles
Bee Gees songs
British disco songs
Billboard Hot 100 number-one singles
Cashbox number-one singles
Number-one singles in Brazil
Number-one singles in Canada
Irish Singles Chart number-one singles
Number-one singles in Spain
RPM Top Singles number-one singles
UK Singles Chart number-one singles
Oricon International Singles Chart number-one singles
Songs from Saturday Night Fever
Songs written by Barry Gibb
Songs written by Maurice Gibb
Songs written by Robin Gibb
RSO Records singles
Bertelsmann Music Group singles
Songs about nights